Sylvester Oliver (1929 – February 1999) was a Trinidadian cricketer. He played in five first-class matches for Trinidad and Tobago from 1954 to 1958.

See also
 List of Trinidadian representative cricketers

References

External links
 

1929 births
1999 deaths
Trinidad and Tobago cricketers